Node Magazine is a literary project in the guise of a fictional magazine created to annotate the novel Spook Country by William Gibson.

The project is essentially a hypertext version of the novel. It takes its name from Node, a non-existent magazine in Spook Country owned by Hubertus Bigend, which employs the novel's protagonist to pursue the source of locative art.

The project drew attention from the novelist, and has been featured in The Guardian, The Washington Post, Salon, The Seattle Times and the Santa Cruz Sentinel. The academic literary critic John Sutherland has claimed that the project threatened "to completely overhaul the way literary criticism is conducted".

Origin
The project was initiated when the recipient of an advanced reading copy of the novel mobilised "an army of volunteers" to track the references and assemble the cloud of data surrounding the novel – every element of the work which is searchable on internet resources such as Google and Wikipedia. The pseudonymous author, under the pen name patternBoy, conceived the Node project as "a multi-author blog of fictional news stories in the Spook Country universe", and did not anticipate that it would itself become the focus of media attention. He declared the launch of the Node tumblog sister-site to Node Magazine on June 24, 2007, with the following announcement:

The project has precedent in Joe Clark's PR-Otaku, an attempt at logging and annotating Gibson's preceding novel Pattern Recognition. Gibson has noted that while PR-Otaku "took a couple of years to come together", Node was complete before the novel was even published.

Significance
Sutherland credits the project as "giving an extraordinary reading of [the] novel in which everything is concretized – solidity and specification is added to [the] text." He has conceived this as nothing less than a new form of hyper-annotation:

Gibson in turn has characterized the project as "a sort of little Wikipedia" for Spook Country, and has declared it to be "stunning," remarkably accurate, genuinely novel and "sort of scary." He has spoken of his newfound awareness when writing of "a ghostly cloud of hypertext hanging around the text of the manuscript," the alteration this has on the way readers experience the text, and the fact that all his research will be retraceable by readers of his work.

References

External links
 nodemagazine.com
 node.tumblr.com
 "Spook Country" hyperlink cloud annotations  a version with extra hyperlink annotations, without repeating the graphical images, with extra independent hyperlink annotations, re-ordered into chapter sequence order, as one medium / large blog archive file.
 ZeroHistory.net, a blog focusing on Gibson's follow-up to Spook Country, Zero History

American literature websites
Literary criticism
William Gibson